Sakka may refer to:

Places
Sakka, Rif Dimashq Governorate, a village near Damascus, Syria 
Limmu Sakka, one of the woredas in the Oromia Region of Ethiopia
Ras ben Sakka, the northernmost point of the African continent

Other
 Sakka (surname)
 Śakra (Buddhism), a deity, the ruler of Tāvatiṃsa heaven according to Buddhist cosmology
 Sakka (publisher), a Belgian publisher

See also 
 Śakra (disambiguation)